Luçiano Boçi is a member of the Assembly of the Republic of Albania for the Democratic Party of Albania. Luciano Boçi is currently the chairman of the parliamentary group of the Democratic Party of Albania.

Early life and Politics 
Boçi born in 26 March 1967 in Elbasan he started out his career as a Professor from 1989-1991 at the University of Elbasan. From 1991-2009 as a Pedagog at the University. Eventually Boçi was given the role as Deputy to the Rector of the University and Chief of his Department up until 2009 when he began his career as a member of Parliament from 2009 until 2017 and again from 2021. Boçi during the 2021 election campaigning had been caught on video fighting with a Socialist campaigner in Elbasan accusing him of vote buying. Which caused Boçi to get into an altercation with the accused Socialist. Boçi has been critical against Enkelejd Alibeaj and Gazment Bardhi. Both Alibeaj and Boçi are in a dispute between each other over Parliamentary leadership of PD. Boçi and Alibeaj both claim they lead the group of PD. Since the dispute has continued Berisha is considered the De facto leader of PD and Alibeaj the De jure. Since the party is split into five groups it is uncertain who is the official group leader of the Democratic party of Albania.

References

Living people
Democratic Party of Albania politicians
Members of the Parliament of Albania
21st-century Albanian politicians
1967 births